Tidjelabine is a commune in Boumerdès Province within Algeria.

It may also refer to: 

 2005 Tidjelabine bombing, a terrorist attack in Algeria.
 2006 Tidjelabine bombing, a terrorist attack in Algeria.
 2010 Tidjelabine bombing, a terrorist attack in Algeria.